This is a summary of 1933 in music in the United Kingdom.

Events
December – Edward Elgar, knowing he is suffering from cancer and does not have time to  complete his Third Symphony, tells William Henry Reed: "Don't let them tinker with it, Billy – burn it!"

Popular music
"My Lucky Day" and "Happy Ending" by Harry Parr-Davies, performed by Gracie Fields.

Classical music: new works
Arnold Bax – Symphonic Scherzo
Arthur Bliss – Viola Sonata
Benjamin Britten – A Boy Was Born
Rebecca Clarke – The Tiger
Eric Coates – London Suite.
Gustav Holst 
Brook Green Suite
Lyric Movement
Ralph Vaughan Williams – A London Symphony (revised)

Film and Incidental music
Bretton Byrd – Friday the Thirteenth
Colin Wark
Song of the Plough  
Doss House

Musical theatre
22 November – That's a Pretty Thing (Music: Noel Gay Lyrics: Desmond Carter Book: Stanley Lupino) opens at Daly's Theatre and runs for 103 performances.

Musical films
 Aunt Sally, starring Cicely Courtneidge and Sam Hardy and featuring Debroy Somers and his Band.  Directed by Tim Whelan.
 Bitter Sweet, directed by Herbert Wilcox, starring Anna Neagle and Fernand Gravey 
Facing the Music, directed by Harry Hughes, starring Stanley Lupino, Jose Collins and Nancy Brown 
The Good Companions, directed by Victor Saville, starring Jessie Matthews and Edmund Gwenn
Happy, directed by Frederic Zelnik, starring Stanley Lupino, Dorothy Hyson, Laddie Cliff and Will Fyffe.
That's a Good Girl, starring Jack Buchanan, Elsie Randolph|

Births
20 January – Gerry Monroe, singer (died 1989)
7 February – Stuart Burrows, operatic tenor
14 February – James Simmons, poet, literary critic and songwriter (died 2001)
22 February – Katharine, Duchess of Kent, patron of music
1 March – Gerry Bron, record producer and manager (d. 2012)
6 March – Dolly Collins, folk musician, arranger and composer (died 1995)
14 April – Shani Wallis, actress and singer
21 April – Ian Carr, jazz musician, composer, writer, and educator (died 2009)
22 May – Don Estelle, actor and singer (died 2003)
30 May – Michael Garrick, jazz pianist and composer (died 2011)
10 June — Ian Campbell, folk singer (died 2012)
15 July – Julian Bream, guitarist and lutenist
23 July – Bernard Roberts, pianist (died 2013)
29 July – Anne Rogers, actress, singer and dancer
15 August – Rita Hunter, operatic soprano (died 2001)
21 August – Dame Janet Baker, operatic mezzo-soprano
23 August – Ian Fraser, Emmy-nominated composer, conductor, arranger and music director (died 2014)
10 October – Daniel Massey, star of musical theatre (died 1998)
21 October – Georgia Brown, actress and singer (died 1992)
3 November – John Barry, film composer (died 2011)
23 November – John Sanders, organist, conductor and composer (died 2003)
10 December – Don Charles, singer and record producer (died 2005)
30 December – Andy Stewart, singer (died 1993)

Deaths
3 March – Robert Radford, bass singer, 58
15 April – Ernest Bucalossi, British-Italian light music composer and arranger, 73
26 April – Francesco Berger, pianist and composer, 98
10 September – Adrian Ross, English lyricist, 73

See also
 1933 in British television
 1933 in the United Kingdom
 List of British films of 1933

References

British Music, 1933 in
Music
British music by year
1930s in British music